Mifflin Bermúdez Tucto (born 4 February 1968) is a Peruvian football manager and former player who played as an attacking midfielder. He is the current manager of Sport Huancayo.

Playing career
Born in Huánuco, Bermúdez was named after Ramón Mifflin, and began his career with hometown side León de Huánuco in 1987. He also represented Unión Minas, La Loretana and Melgar, and opted to retire from professional football in 2002 after Minas suffered relegation.

Managerial career
Bermúdez began his managerial career in 2003, acting as a player-manager at Deportivo Junín. In 2007, he led Sport Águila to the Copa Perú finals, but lost to Juan Aurich.

Bermúdez was subsequently in charge of several Copa Perú and Segunda División sides, before joining Sport Huancayo in 2019 as manager of the reserve team. On 9 August 2022, he was named interim manager of the first team after Carlos Desio was sacked.

On 25 August 2022, Bermúdez was permanently appointed manager of Huancayo.

References

External links

1968 births
Living people
People from Huánuco
Peruvian footballers
Association football midfielders
Peruvian Primera División players
León de Huánuco footballers
Unión Minas footballers
FBC Melgar footballers
Peruvian football managers
Peruvian Primera División managers
Sport Huancayo managers
León de Huánuco managers